The Shopping Bags was a Canadian television series that aired on the W Network in Canada and on Fine Living in the United States. Launched in 2002, the series focused on consumer affairs and better shopping. Each week the program looked at several goods and services to discover which one was the best. This was also done to guide viewers towards which product or service may best suit their needs. The program looked at day-to-day shopping and big ticket items, as well as having a final "Shopping Thought" at the end of each program.

The Shopping Bags was produced in Vancouver, British Columbia, Canada by Worldwide Bag Media Inc. The hosts and show creators are award-winning journalists Anna Wallner and Kristina Matisic. The show first aired on the W Network, a television channel in Canada aimed at women. The program was also broadcast on Fine Living in the United States, a channel aimed at both male and female viewers.

In 2005, a companion book to The Shopping Bags television show was written by Wallner and Matisic and published in 2006. The book is titled The Shopping Bags: Tips, Tricks, and Inside Information to Make You a Savvy Shopper.

The show received seven awards including the 2007 Leo Award for Best Hosts in an Information or Lifestyle Series and the 2006 Leo Award for Best Hosts in an Information or Lifestyle Series.

The show ended in 2008, and was replaced by Anna & Kristina's Grocery Bag.

List of guest experts
(Names are from the episodes)
Martha Stewart, American business magnate, author, editor, former stock broker, model, homemaking advocate, and convicted felon (insider trading).
Diane von Furstenberg, Fashion Designer
Randy Bachman
Robin Coope, Physicist
Nina Hirvi, Nutritionist
Vincent Pastore, Television Actor and Sirius Satellite Radio Broadcaster
Candice Olson, Interior designer
Paula Begoun, Beauty Expert and Author
Jason Rivers, Dermatologist
Massimo Marcone, Food scientist
Rob Feenie, Chef
Robert Colin Newell, Coffee expert-writer-blogger
Dr. Derek Swain, Child psychologist and School Counselor

See also
Anna & Kristina's Grocery Bag
Anna & Kristina's Beauty Call

References

External links
 Anna & Kristina's (The Shopping Bags) official website
 Program website from W Network
 Program website from Fine Living
 Excerpt from The Shopping Bags book from Good Morning America
 Kristina Matisic's bio on Anna & Kristina's official website
 Anna Wallner's bio on Anna & Kristina's official website
 TV show fan page for The Shopping Bags on Facebook
 Anna & Kristina's photostream on Flickr
 Anna & Kristina's tweets on Twitter
 Anna & Kristina's videos on YouTube
 Worldwide Bag Media Inc. corporate information
 CoffeeCrew.com Canada's oldest coffee website

2000s Canadian television news shows
Television shows filmed in Vancouver
Television series by Force Four Entertainment
Consumer protection television series
W Network original programming